The Bastide Bel-Air is a historic bastide in Aix-en-Provence, France. It is located on the chemin des Platanes in the northern section of Aix-en-Provence, in southeastern France.

The bastide was built in the second half of the 18th century. It has been listed as an official historical monument by the French Ministry of Culture since 1980.

References

Houses completed in the 18th century
Monuments historiques of Aix-en-Provence
18th-century architecture in France